Johann Christoph Frisch (born 9 February 1738 in Berlin; died 28 February 1815 in Berlin) was a historical painter. He was the son of the designer and engraver, Ferdinand Helfreich Frisch. He was a pupil of B. Rode and afterwards studied further at Rome. He died in 1815, while holding the posts of court painter and director of the Academy. He painted numerous ceilings in the palaces at Berlin, Potsdam, and Sans Souci, with portraits, mythological representations, and scenes from the life of Frederick the Great.

See also
 List of German painters

References

 

1737 births
1815 deaths
18th-century German painters
18th-century German male artists
German male painters
19th-century German painters
19th-century German male artists
Artists from Berlin
Court painters
Members of the Academy of Arts, Berlin
Academic staff of the Prussian Academy of Arts